The  British Honduran Forestry Unit (BHFU) was a civilian body of forestry workers who came from British Honduras to Scotland in two contingents to help support the war effort during the Second World War. 900 workers came, the first 500 arriving in September 1941 and were dispersed to camps in Traprain Law, East Lothian, Duns, Scottish Borders, and Kirkpatrick Fleming, Dumfries and Galloway. The second contingent of 400 arrived in November 1942, and were allocated to Golspie, Sutherland, and Kinlochewe and Achnashellach both in Wester Ross. In 1943 the Unit was disbanded.

Lord Moyne, the Secretary of State for the Colonies, contacted Sir John Adams Hunter, the Governor of British Honduras requesting workers to help cut timber in Scotland’s forests.

Members
Five members of the unit based at Kirkpatrick Fleming died there, and four are buried in the graveyard of Kirkpatrick Fleming church, with the fifth buried in. A further three, based at Traprain Law, are buried in Whittingehame H. Moss, (died 26 October 1941, aged  20), I. Mendoza (died 4 December 1942, aged 21), H. Velasquez, died 25 December 1941, aged 35.

Sam Martinez (1910-2016) was 32 when he joined the BHFU. When the unit disbanded, he learnt his wife back in Belize had moved in with someone else and so he chose to stay in Scotland getting a job as a cook in British Honduras House, a hostel in Edinburgh’s York Place. He got married and settled down in Edinburgh and becoming Hibernian FC's oldest fan. When he died at the age of 106, he was survived by his six children, nine grandchildren and five great-grandchildren.

References

Military history of British Honduras during World War II
Forestry in Scotland